Love in the Time of Cholera is a 2007 American romantic drama film directed by Mike Newell. Based on the 1985 novel of the same name by Gabriel García Márquez, it tells the story of a love triangle between Fermina Daza (played by Giovanna Mezzogiorno) and her two suitors, Florentino Ariza (Javier Bardem) and Doctor Juvenal Urbino (Benjamin Bratt) which spans 50 years, from 1880 to 1930.

It is the first filming of a García Márquez novel by a Hollywood studio, rather than by Latin American or Italian directors. It is also the first English-language work of Academy Award-nominated Brazilian actress Fernanda Montenegro, who portrays Tránsito Ariza. Shakira wrote two original songs "Hay Amores" and "Despedida" for the film.

Plot 

In late 19th-century Cartagena, a river port in Colombia, Florentino Ariza falls in love at first sight with Fermina Daza. They secretly correspond, and she eventually agrees to marry him, but her father discovers their relationship and sends her to stay with distant relatives (mainly her grandmother and niece). When she returns some years later, Fermina agrees to marry Dr. Juvenal Urbino, her father's choice. Their 50-year marriage is outwardly loving but inwardly marred by darker emotions.  Fermina's marriage devastates Florentino, who vows to remain a virgin, but his self-denial is thwarted by a tryst.

To help Florentino get over Fermina, his mother throws a willing widow into his bed, and Florentino discovers that sex is a very good pain reliever, one he uses to replace the opium that he had habitually smoked. Florentino begins to record and describe each of his sexual encounters, beginning with the widow, and eventually compiles over 600 entries.

Now a lowly clerk, Florentino plods resolutely over many years to approach the wealth and social standing of Dr. Urbino. When the now-elderly doctor dies suddenly, Florentino immediately and impertinently resumes courting Fermina.

Cast

 Javier Bardem as Florentino Ariza
 Unax Ugalde as Young Florentino Ariza
 Giovanna Mezzogiorno as Fermina Daza
 Benjamin Bratt as Dr. Juvenal Urbino
 John Leguizamo as Lorenzo Daza
 Fernanda Montenegro as Tránsito Ariza
 Catalina Sandino Moreno as Hildebranda Sánchez
 Alicia Borrachero as Escolástica
 Liev Schreiber as Lotario Thurgot
 Laura Harring as Sara Noriega
 Hector Elizondo as Don Leo
 Ana Claudia Talancón as Olimpia Zuleta
 Angie Cepeda as The Widow Nazaret
 Patricia Castañeda as Grand Lady 4
 Marcela Mar as America Vicuña
 Paola Turbay as Mystery Woman 2

Production

Film locations
Much of the film takes place in the historic, walled city of Cartagena in Colombia. Some screen shots showed the Magdalena River and the Sierra Nevada de Santa Marta mountain range.

Title sequence 
The London-based animation studio VooDooDog created the title and end sequences, which draw inspiration from the colors and atmosphere of South America.

Reception

Gabriel García Márquez
According to an interview by Colombian magazine Revista Semana, Scott Steindorff, producer of the film, showed an unreleased final edition of the film to Gabriel García Márquez in Mexico who, at the end of the film, is said to have exclaimed "Bravo!" with a smile on his face.

Critical response
On Rotten Tomatoes, the film has an approval rating of 25% based on reviews from 110 critics, with an average rating of 4.7/10. The website's critical consensus reads, "Though beautifully filmed, the makers of Love in the Time of Cholera fail to transfer the novel's magic to the screen." On Metacritic, the film had an average score of 43 out of 100, based on 29 reviews, indicating "mixed or average reviews".

Time rated it "D" and described it as "a serious contender [for] the worst movie ever made from a great novel ... Skip the film; reread the book."

Lisa Schwarzbaum of Entertainment Weekly, gave it a "D" rating and called it a "turgid and lifeless movie adaptation", opining that "those who have read Gabriel García Márquez's glowing and sexy 1988 novel about one man's grand love for a woman who marries another are bound to be peevishly disappointed ... those who haven't read the book will now never understand the ardor of those who have — at least not based on all the hammy traipsing and coupling and scene-hopping thrown together here."

In the Los Angeles Times, Carina Chocano stated, "the novel has made it to the screen in the form of a plodding, tone-deaf, overripe, overheated Oscar baiting telenovela ... Doubtless it's an enormously daunting task to adapt a book at once so sweeping and internal, so swooningly romantic and philosophical, but it takes a lighter touch and a more expansive view than Newell and Harwood seem to bring."

Despedida, written for the film by Shakira and Antonio Pinto, was nominated for a Golden Globe for Best Song.

Box office
In its opening weekend in the United States and Canada, the film ranked #10 at the box office, grossing $1.9 million in 852 theaters.

References

External links
 
 
 
 
 
 

2007 films
2007 drama films
American drama films
Films based on romance novels
Films based on works by Gabriel García Márquez
Films directed by Mike Newell
Films set in Colombia
Films set in the 1880s
Films set in the 1890s
Films set in the 1900s
Films set in the 1910s
Films set in the 1920s
Films with screenplays by Ronald Harwood
Films scored by Antônio Pinto
Cockfighting in film
2000s English-language films
2000s American films